"Lost In America" is a song by American musician Ross Mintzer, released as a single 2013. "Lost In America" was recorded by the Ross Mintzer Band.

Personnel 
Ross Mintzer - vocals, acoustic guitar
Milton Vann - Vocals 
Julian Varner - Piano and Organ
Geoff Kraly - Bass
Josh Dion - Drums
Kevin Ryan - Harmonica

External links
 Full lyrics to this song at MTV Italy

References

2013 songs
2013 singles